The Planetarium Science Center is a department in the Bibliotheca Alexandrina in Alexandria, Egypt. It promotes the concept of science centers as an educational tool.

Pre- Historic Animal Park 
The Science Park also has a Dinosaur Park that houses models of a large number of prehistoric animals.

 Ankylosaurus – Armoured dinosaur
 Triceratops – Three horned face
 Anatosaurus – Duck billed dinosaur
 Gallimimus – Rooster mimic
 Corythosaurus – helmet lizard
 T-Rex – Tyrant lizard king
 Psittacosaurus – Parrot lizard
 Brachiosaurus – arm lizard
 Oviraptor – egg robber
 Stegosaurus – covered lizard or roof lizard
 Scelidosaurus – limb lizard
 Plateosarurus – flat lizard
 Dimetrodon gradis – Two measures tooth

The Sections of the PSC

The Planetarium 

A planetarium may be defined as:
A building housing an instrument for projecting the position of celestial bodies onto a domed ceiling.
An optical device for projecting images of celestial bodies and astronomical phenomena onto the inner surface of a hemispherical dome.

The Bibliotheca Alexandrina's Planetarium Shows:
 Solarmax (IMAX 40min.)
 Star Show (Live Show 45min.)
 Oasis in Space (Panorama 25 min.)
 Ring of fire (IMAX 40 min.)
 Human Body (IMAX 40 min.)

ALEXPloratorium 

It is located next to the Planetarium, where visitors are able to interact with its exhibits which cover various scientific topics, with emphasis on Physics and Astronomy.

Listen and Discover 

Short and simple scientific documentary films are displayed according to a predefined schedule. The goal of these films is to help audiences understand scientific issues with attention grabbing and simple explanations.

Programs in the PSC

Hands-on workshops 
Within the mission and strategy adopted by the PSC. The History of Science Museum conducts a variety of workshops to facilitate and animate the information in the museum in a simple manner.

Topics offered in the PSC workshops include: 
Chemistry
Volcanoes
DNA
Agriculture
Five senses
Sound
Genetics
Air
Magnetics
Dinosaurs
First aid
Colors
Mechanics
Gravity
Light
Time measurement

Remote Sensing Workshop 
This program introduces the scientific participles of remote sensing and offers hands-on applications. Participants witness the impact of natural events through history using a series of satellite images, as well as through analysis of recent images. They are also exposed to other environmental issues that relate to the theme of the workshop.

Zoom Earth Program
This program comprises different kinds of educational activities, such as series of lectures, workshops and field trips. The program mainly tackles topics such as irrigation, meteorology, volcanoes and earthquakes.

Discover your Environment Camp 
A winter camp, Discover your Environment directs students to interact with various fields of science through activities in the courses of a journey to the Siwa desert, organized by the PSC.

RoboAlex Center
The RoboAlex Center at the Alexploratorium offers hands-on robotic challenges guided by animators. The participating groups design, program, and test robots on a playing field, with the goal of accomplishing certain missions.

Science Club
Science Club implements educational and science programs at schools; they aim to "simulate curiosity, interest and enjoyment in science and its methods of inquiry, to develop experiment and investigative abilities and develop children's abilities and skills."

Super Science Show
The Super Science Show gets participating children involved in hands-on experiments. The show includes experiments in the fields of physics, biology, and chemistry.

Alexploratorium Contest
The Alexploratorium Contest familiarize students of different age groups with topics relevant to general science, such as IQ tests and teamwork; as well as tackling major scientific discoveries.

Important events in the PSC

Eratosthenes
Eratosthenes is a traditional annual Festival that the Bibliotheca Alexandrina organizes with the aim of promoting science and heritage among school students. The Festivities of 2003-2008 evolved around measuring the Earth's circumference, following the footsteps of Eratosthenes.

First-Lego League in Egypt Competition Finale
The result of an alliance between FIRST(For Inspiration and Recogenition of Science and Technology) and LEGO, FIRST LEGO League (FLL) is an international hands-on, sport-like robotics program for children 9-14. 
Guided by mentors, FLL student solve engineering challenges.

Intel BASEF
The Planetarium Science Center (PSC), in collaboration with Intel Co. organizes the Intel Bibliotheca Alexandrina Science and Engineering Fair (Intel BASEF), which is hosted by the Bibliotheca Alexandrina (BA) in March. Intel BASEF brings together students in grades 9–12; 14–18 years of age; from Alexandria and neighboring governorates, to train, research, innovate, and compete.
The winning projects, one team project and two individual projects, represent Egypt in the Intel International Science and Engineering Fair (Intel ISEF) that takes place in the United States of America.

World Water Day
On the occasion of the international celebration of World Water Day, the PSC organizes one-day festivals.

World Environmental Day
Commemorated each year on 5 June, World Environmental Day (or simply Earth Day) is one of the vehicles through which the United Nations stimulates worldwide awareness of the environment and enhances political attention and action. The Slogan for 2008 was "CO2 Kick the habit": Towards a low-carbon Economy.

The Planetarium's Revamp 
The Bibliotheca Alexandrina reopened its planetarium doors after having equipped itself with a newly installed state of the art dome projection system and a set of shows to go along with it.

With the new system running, the sea-side Bibliotheca and the Planetarium Science Center (PSC, the library's affiliate nonprofit educational center) are now ready to jointly host the 20th International Planetarium Society conference in June, 2010.

Digistar 3
The planetarium describes its new system which is known as Digistar 3 as a "cutting-edge full-dome projection system with a rich set of real-time 3D astronomy features and a wide database of celestial bodies that enables the audience to explore the universe as never before."

Stunning Shows

"Stars of the Pharaohs" is one of the shows currently displayed at the PSC which is centered on Ancient Egyptian astronomy. It answers questions like how much truth is there to claims that the Pharaohs' monuments were observatories, possessed magical powers or were even built by aliens? How did the Egyptians see and use the stars, and what is their legacy to us?

"New Horizons" on the other hand is a show focusing on modern astronomical discoveries and insights. The show promises to take the viewer on an "expedition through the Solar System and into the realm of comets." Its focus is one of exploration. (Alexandria's Planetarium Revamps its Gear)

See also 
 List of planetariums
 Bibliotheca Alexandrina
 Library of Alexandria
 Planetarium
 International Planetarium Society
 Observatory

References 
Planetarium Science Center official website
Intel Bibliotheca Alexandria Science and Engineering Fair official website.

External links

Buildings and structures in Alexandria
Science and technology in Egypt
Scientific organisations based in Egypt
Bibliotheca Alexandrina
Planetaria